Unreal!!! was the seventh studio album of Ray Stevens and his second for Barnaby Records, released in 1970. Two singles ("America, Communicate With Me" and "Sunset Strip") were lifted from the album and were moderately successful on the Hot 100 pop singles chart. Each single reached the Top-20 on the Billboard Adult-Contemporary chart, indicating that Stevens' appeal, even as early as 1970, lay with the adult music buyers rather than the kids and teenagers. All but two of the tracks were written by Stevens himself, with one of the others, "Talking," being written by Stevens's brother, John Ragsdale.

On May 17, 2005, Collectables Records re-released this album and Stevens' previous album Everything Is Beautiful together on one CD.

Track listing

Album credits
All songs arranged and produced by: Ray Stevens for Ahab Productions, Inc.
Engineer: Charlie Tallent
All songs published by: Ahab Music Co., Inc. (BMI)
Front cover photo: Keats Tyler
Back cover photo courtesy of NBC-TV

Charts
Album - Billboard (North America)

Singles - Billboard (North America)

1970 albums
Barnaby Records albums
Ray Stevens albums